The Douglas XO2D-1 was a prototype American observation floatplane of the 1930s.  It was a single engined biplane intended to be launched by aircraft catapult from ships of the United States Navy, but only one was built, the production contract going to Curtiss for the SOC Seagull.

Development and design
In 1933, the United States Navy had a requirement to replace its Vought O3U Corsair as the standard aircraft catapult launched observation aircraft aboard US Navy ships, and in June of that year it placed an order for a single example of a design from Douglas Aircraft Company, the XO2D-1, together with aircraft from Curtiss (the XO3C-1) and Vought (the XO5U-1). Douglas's design was a single engined biplane with single-bay wings of sesquiplane configuration that folded for shipboard storage. It was of all-metal construction, and housed the crew of two in tandem under an enclosed canopy.  It was powered by a Pratt & Whitney Wasp radial engine, and to allow easy operation from land, was fitted with a tailwheel undercarriage whose twin mainwheels retracted into the single main float.

It was first flown in March 1934, being tested at Anacostia and Naval Air Station Norfolk. It was rejected in favour of the Curtiss design, which was ordered into production as the SOC Seagull in March 1935.  After further testing it was withdrawn from use on 13 September 1935.

Specifications (XO2D-1)

See also

References

Notes

Bibliography

Francillon, René J. McDonnell Douglas Aircraft since 1920. London:Putnam, 1979. .

1930s United States military reconnaissance aircraft
O2D
Floatplanes
Single-engined tractor aircraft
Sesquiplanes
Aircraft first flown in 1934